Carex heteroneura is a species of sedge known by the common name different-nerve sedge. It is native to western Canada and the western United States, where it grows in moist mountain habitat such as forests and meadows.

Description
This sedge produces clumps of stems up to a meter-3 feet tall, often much shorter. The plant is variable in appearance, including in the appearance of its identifying characters, such as the scales on the flowers and the perigynia on the fruits. In general the spikes are oblong or cylindrical and dense with bicolored spikelets. The perigynium is greenish or purplish and has a short, rounded tip.

External links
Jepson Manual Treatment - Carex heteroneura
USDA Plants Profile
Flora of North America
Carex heteroneura - Photo gallery

heteroneura
Flora of the Western United States
Flora of Western Canada
Flora of the Sierra Nevada (United States)
Flora of California
Plants described in 1880
Flora without expected TNC conservation status